Ben Aziz Zagré (born 1 January 1998) is a Burkinabé professional footballer who plays as a defender for Kaisar and the Burkina Faso national team.

International career
Zagré made his debut with the Burkina Faso national team in a 2–0 friendly loss to Egypt on 27 February 2016.

References

External links

1998 births
Living people
People from Bobo-Dioulasso
Burkinabé footballers
Burkina Faso international footballers
Esbjerg fB players
Vitória S.C. B players
Burkinabé Premier League players
Danish 1st Division players
Campeonato de Portugal (league) players
Association football defenders
Burkinabé expatriate footballers
Burkinabé expatriates in Denmark
Expatriate men's footballers in Denmark
Burkinabé expatriates in Portugal
Expatriate footballers in Portugal
21st-century Burkinabé people
KOZAF players